Woodrow Wilson and the Birth of the American Century is a 2002 documentary, narrated by Linda Hunt, that was aired in the United States as a two-part limited television series starting on January 6, 2002. The documentary won an IDA Award for its directors Carl Byker and Mitch Wilson in the category of "Limited Series".

References

External links

American Experience
Documentaries about historical events
Woodrow Wilson
Films about presidents of the United States
2002 television films
2002 films
Documentary films about United States history
2000s English-language films